Ernest George Read (8 October 1873 — 21 March 1921) was an English first-class cricketer.

Read was born at Portsmouth in October 1873 and was educated in Oxford at St Edward's School. Although born in Hampshire, he was resident in Sussex and played club cricket in the county for Worthing and Heathfield, scoring heavily for both clubs. By virtue of being born in Hampshire, Read made three appearances in first-class cricket for Hampshire in the 1903 County Championship. The following season, through his residency in Sussex, Read played first-class cricket for Sussex, making two appearances in 1904 against Cambridge University and Oxford University, before making two further appearances in 1906 against Oxford University and Middlesex in the County Championship. Playing as an occasional wicket-keeper in first-class cricket, he scored 113 runs in his seven matches at an average of 10.27, with a highest score of 10.27. As a fielder, he took 7 catches. Read died at Wandsworth in March 1921. His uncle, Russell Bencraft, was also a first-class cricketer.

References

External links

1873 births
1921 deaths
Cricketers from Portsmouth
People educated at St Edward's School, Oxford
English cricketers
Hampshire cricketers
Sussex cricketers